Rugbyclub Diabolos is a Belgian rugby club in Schilde.

External links
 Rugbyclub Diabolos

Belgian rugby union clubs
Sport in Antwerp Province
Schilde
1991 establishments in Belgium
Rugby clubs established in 1991